The SkyBridge is a cable-stayed bridge in Metro Vancouver, British Columbia, Canada. Built between 1987 and 1989, it spans the Fraser River and connects New Westminster with Surrey. The SkyBridge opened for revenue use on March 16, 1990, with the second half of the Phase II extension of SkyTrain to Scott Road station.

History
Construction of the bridge began on October 28, 1987. The first half of the bridge heading towards Surrey was completed first, with the New Westminster half being completed on March 19, 1990. The bridge was manufactured by Hyundai Engineering & Construction and a Chilliwack-based construction company with a total cost of CAD$28 million, or $ in  dollars. Construction was completed by September 1988, and testing began in 1989.

Details

The SkyBridge does not carry automobiles, unlike the neighbouring Pattullo Bridge, but has two tracks to let TransLink's SkyTrain pass either way on the bridge on its journey between King George station in Surrey and Waterfront station in Downtown Vancouver. A third set of rails in the middle, not connected to the SkyTrain tracks, is used by maintenance crews to truck equipment back and forth on the bridge. The deck is composed of 104 pre-fabricated concrete sections which were built in Richmond, transported via barge, and lifted into place with heavy machinery. When constructed, the concrete sections were glued together with an epoxy resin. 

The bridge was the longest cable-supported transit-only bridge in the world from its opening in 1990 to 2019, it has since been surpassed by the Egongyan Rail Transit Bridge, the Nanjimen Yangtze River Bridge and tied with the Gaojia Huayuan Jialing River Rail Transit Bridge, all in Chongqing, China.

Delayed opening 
The opening of the bridge faced some delay as the non-unionized consortium was accused of underbidding unionized firms. In response, labour organizers pressured other unions to boycott the project altogether. The issue was the climax of a series of defeats for construction unions as a result of the Social Credit Party's preference for non-union workers. The situation drew ire from the BC and Yukon Building and Construction Trades Council, who called it a "hot site".

See also
 List of crossings of the Fraser River
 List of bridges in British Columbia

Notes

References
 Bridges of Greater Vancouver

External links

Illustration of the SkyBridge
Crossing the SkyBridge (YouTube Video)

1989 establishments in British Columbia
Bridges completed in 1989
Bridges in Greater Vancouver
Bridges over the Fraser River
Buildings and structures in New Westminster
Buildings and structures in Surrey, British Columbia
Cable-stayed bridges in Canada
Expo Line (SkyTrain)
Railway bridges in British Columbia
Rapid transit bridges